Bakavol or Bekavol may refer to:
 Bakavol, Nishapur
 Bekavol, Torbat-e Heydarieh